V424 Lacertae (V424 Lac) is a red supergiant variable star in the constellation Lacerta.  It is a member of the Lacerta OB1 stellar association.

The MK spectral type of V424 Lac has been determined to be K5, but it has also been classified as M0.  It was discovered to be slightly variable using analysis of Hipparcos photometry.  The total range is less than a tenth of a magnitude.  Multiple short periods are detected, as well as slow variations with a period of 1,100 or 1,601 days.  Although listed in the General Catalogue of Variable Stars as a slow irregular variable, it has been considered to be either a semiregular variable or long secondary period variable.

There is an ultraviolet excess from V424 Lacertae, that may be due to an unseen companion, which could also explain the long secondary period.  On this assumption, a sub-stellar companion in a 1,382 day 6.2 AU orbit has been suggested.

References

Lacerta (constellation)
M-type supergiants
K-type supergiants
Lacertae, V424
Durchmusterung objects
216946
8726
113288
Slow irregular variables